Rex B. Williams (May 12, 1918 – September 8, 2007) was an American football player. 

Born in Bonham, Texas, Williams attended Sherman High School in Texas and played college football for Texas Tech from 1937 to 1939. He played professional football in the National Football League (NFL) as a center for the Chicago Cardinals in 1940 and for the Detroit Lions in 1945. He appeared in three NFL games. Between stints with the Cardinals and Lions, he served in the U.S. Navy during World War II. He was released by the Lions in mid-October 1945.

References

1918 births
2007 deaths
Texas Tech Red Raiders football players
Chicago Cardinals players
Detroit Lions players
Players of American football from Texas
United States Navy personnel of World War II